Novaya Maka is a rural locality (a selo) and the administrative centre of Novomakinsky Selsoviet, Suleyman-Stalsky District, Republic of Dagestan, Russia. The population was 3,706 as of 2010. There are 56 streets.

Geography 
Chukhverkent is the nearest rural locality.

References 

Rural localities in Suleyman-Stalsky District